Several extant building fulfill the engineering definition of a tower: "a tall human structure, always taller than it is wide, for public or regular operational access by humans, but not for living in or office work, and are self-supporting or free-standing, which means no guy-wires for support." This definition excludes continuously habitable buildings and skyscrapers as well as radio and TV masts. Also excluded  because they are not designed for public or regular operational access are bridge towers or pylons, wind turbines, chimneys, transmission towers, sculptures and most large statues and obelisks.

Towers are most often built to use their height for various purposes, and can stand alone or as part of a larger structure. Some common purposes are for telecommunications, and as a viewing platform.

Entirely self-supported towers

Towers taller than 250 meters

Towers between 200 and 250 metres tall 
 Please read the list criteria in the introduction before adding any entry.

Towers between 150 and 200 metres tall 

 Please read the list criteria in the introduction before adding any entry.

Towers between 100 and 150 metres tall 

 Please read the list criteria in the introduction before adding any entry.

Towers proposed or under construction
This is a list of towers that are proposed or under construction with a minimum height of 250m

Diagram

Timeline of tallest towers

See also 
 Lattice tower
 Partially guyed tower
 Additionally guyed tower
 List of tallest church buildings
 List of tallest crosses
 List of fire lookout towers
 Smog tower

References 

Tallest
Towers
Lists of construction records